No No No is the fourth studio album by indie folk band Beirut. It was released on September 11, 2015 on 4AD.

Critical reception

No No No received generally positive reviews from contemporary music critics. At Metacritic, which assigns a normalized rating out of 100 to reviews from mainstream critics, the album received an average score of 64, based on 20 reviews, which indicates "generally favorable reviews".

Mackenzie Herd of Exclaim! praised the album, stating, "Despite rhythmic vitality and the addition of optimistic trumpet and trombone, Condon's lyrics reveal a man still suffering from loss and longing. Although none of the nine songs exceed the four-minute mark, the lyrics for each are even shorter by comparison, and are often repeated for emphasis. Repetition as a rhetorical device is perhaps most evident on "Fener," on which Condon sings, "I had to know, I had to know, where you had gone," or the title track, when Condon repeats the same stanza twice over. Condon is at the heart of each song, so while a hopeful tone is central to both the music and lyrics, No No No is a portrait of a man putting on a brave face while piecing his life back together, and it's all the more engaging for it."

NME was more critical of the album, stating, "While 2011’s ‘The Rip Tide’ was certainly more pared down in comparison to its orchestral predecessors, here Condon (who went through a divorce and hospital treatment for exhaustion before making this new record) seems to have stripped away his most intriguing tropes altogether. The corny staccato keys of ‘August Holland’ merely churn on like a Ben Folds Five cast-off and Condon moans aimlessly over ‘Pacheco’’s gooey synth schmaltz in search of a chorus, never quite finding the hooks to base one on."

Track listing

Personnel
 Zach Condon – vocals, piano, synthesizer (Roland, Moog Rogue, Korg, Moog Sub Phatty, Moog Voyager, juno), trumpet, organ (farfisa, pump organ), electric piano (wurlitzer), mellotron, ukulele, rhodes, celesta
 Nick Petree – percussion, acoustic and electric guitar, backing vocals
 Paul Collins – bass, electric guitar, double bass, organ (farfisa), backing vocals
 Ben Lanz – trombone
 Kyle Resnick – trumpet
 Clarice Jensen – cello
 Perrin Cloutier – tom tom (tom drum), accordion
 Ben Russell – violin
 Yuki Numata Resnick – violin

Charts

References

2015 albums
4AD albums
Beirut (band) albums